Gebürtig is a 2002 Austrian drama film directed by Robert Schindel and Lukas Stepanik. It was selected as the Austrian entry for the Best Foreign Language Film at the 75th Academy Awards, but it was not nominated.

Cast
 Peter Simonischek as Hermann Gebirtig
 Ruth Rieser as Susanne Ressel
 August Zirner as Danny Demant
 Katja Weitzenböck as Crissie Kalteisen
 Daniel Olbrychski as Konrad Sachs

See also
 List of submissions to the 75th Academy Awards for Best Foreign Language Film
 List of Austrian submissions for the Academy Award for Best Foreign Language Film

References

External links
 

2002 films
2002 drama films
2000s German-language films
Austrian drama films
German drama films
2000s German films